Sudan Kirati is a Nepalese politician, currently a Cabinet Minister, Government of Nepal, and a member of parliament(MP) of Nepal. Mr Kirati was born on March 2, 1979. He belongs to the Communist Party of Nepal (Maoist Centre), currently serving as the member of the  Federal Parliament of Nepal. In the 2017 Nepalese general election he was elected from the Bhojpur 1 constituency, securing 34394 (56.92%)  votes.

References

Nepal MPs 2017–2022
Living people
1979 births

Communist Party of Nepal (Maoist Centre) politicians
Nepal MPs 2022–present